BA CityFlyer is a British regional airline, and a wholly owned subsidiary of British Airways with its head office based in Didsbury, Manchester, England. It operates a network of domestic and European services from its base at London City Airport. All services operate with BA's full colours, titles and flight numbers. BA Cityflyer Limited holds a United Kingdom Civil Aviation Authority Type A Operating Licence, meaning that it is permitted to carry passengers, cargo and mail on aircraft with 20 or more seats.

History

British Airways' sale of BA Connect to Flybe in 2007 did not include the London City Airport operations and its associated fleet of ten Avro RJ100 regional jet aircraft. This led to British Airways' decision to resurrect erstwhile Gatwick-based CityFlyer Express (which BA had integrated into its Gatwick mainline short-haul operation in 2001, following the acquisition of CityFlyer Express in 1999) as a new wholly owned subsidiary to take over this operation, . BA Cityflyer was awarded an Air Operators Certificate on 8 February 2007, and started operations on 25 March 2007.

In summer 2008, two Avro RJ85 aircraft were added to the fleet for performance and economic reasons - this included overcoming payload restrictions in the summer that could limit existing aircraft to 60 passengers on some days.

In the second half of 2008, BA CityFlyer announced an order for 11 aircraft from the Embraer E-Jet family compromising of six 76 seat Embraer 170 and five 98 seat Embraer 190SR aircraft, plus options for three additional 190SRs with the first aircraft due in the second half of 2009. The first Embraer 190SR was received in 2010.

In February 2016, BA CityFlyer announced that it would commence operating flights from London-Stansted in May 2016. In January and February 2017, it announced that it would commence summer seasonal services from Manchester, Bristol, Edinburgh, Dublin and Birmingham to a variety of destinations in Spain, Italy, Greece and France. This marks the return of BA to the regions after an absence of nearly 10 years. Flights will also operate in the summer between London City and Manchester, operating with Embraer 190SR aircraft.

In 2018, the airline reported nearly doubled profits, with profits increasing 28% and revenue up by 18%. Recently, the airline has pulled out from operating at both Birmingham and Bristol on weekends and has made several changes to its schedule increasing frequency and adding new services to Rome.

In July 2020, in light of the COVID-19 pandemic it was announced that the crew base at Edinburgh Airport would close on 31 October 2020, with the loss of several ground based office jobs and the option for cabin crew and pilots to relocate to London City Airport. On 9 December 2020, it was announced that BA Cityflyer would operate from Southampton Airport starting in May 2021 with flights to 14 European destinations mostly operating on weekends.

Destinations

In addition to their scheduled flights from London City, the airline also operates a number of scheduled and charter flights from Edinburgh, Glasgow, London-Stansted and Belfast City airports primarily to leisure destinations. The airline focuses on serving the financial market, though it has recently expanded into the leisure market, offering routes to Ibiza, Palma and Venice. In 2021, BA Cityflyer started operating 14 weekend flights from Southampton.

Fleet

Current fleet
, the BA Cityflyer fleet consists of the following aircraft:

Former fleet 
As of February 2021, the former BA Cityflyer fleet consists of the following aircraft:

Statistics
BA Cityflyer carried over 2.8 million passengers in 2019, a 4.8% increase from 2018.

Accidents and incidents 

On 13 February 2009, BA CityFlyer Flight 8456 (an Avro RJ100, registered G-BXAR, flying from Amsterdam) suffered a nose-gear collapse whilst landing at London City Airport. None of the 67 passengers or five crew members were seriously injured in the incident, but three passengers suffered minor injuries, two of whom were kept in hospital overnight. After a normal approach the nose landing-gear fractured as it was lowered onto the runway, due to the presence of a fatigue-crack in the upper internal bore of the landing-gear main fitting. It was found that the crack had formed as a result of poor surface finish during manufacture, and the incomplete embodiment of a manufacturer's service bulletin, which the landing-gear maintenance records showed as being implemented at its last overhaul in June 2006. The aircraft was damaged beyond economic repair, and was written off by insurers in May 2009.

References

External links

 British Airways Official Website

2007 establishments in England
Airlines of the United Kingdom
Airlines established in 2007
British companies established in 2007
British Airways
Companies based in Manchester
Oneworld affiliate members
Regional airlines